Stephen James Philibin (born April 11, 1998), better known by his stage name Steve James, is an American record producer, songwriter and DJ.

Career
Steve James was born in Johnstown, Pennsylvania. He began learning the piano at the age of four, classically trained. He was introduced to  progressive house music by his brother and was inspired to pursue electronic music production after seeing Avicii live, at the age of 14. James began experimenting with Ableton at age 15 and found early success with his remix of ZHU's "Faded," which was the top remix of 2014 on Sirius XM's BPM Station.

In the summer of 2015, James took a trip to Los Angeles, California and was introduced to Jason Boyd (Poo Bear).  Upon their first meeting, James played Poo Bear an instrumental idea on the piano, which lead to them co-writing and co-producing the title track on Justin Bieber's fourth studio album, 'Purpose. The album has since gone 3× Platinum in the US (RIAA) and 4× Platinum in Canada.

Following the release of "Purpose", James left Richland High School, passed the GED test, and returned to LA to pursue music full-time. In November 2015, James released his debut single, "Renaissance", on Seeking Blue and  briefly supported the Chainsmokers on their Friendzone tour.

After meeting Martin Garrix in early 2016, James and Garrix collaborated on "In the Name of Love". In March 2016, James snuck into Ultra Music Festival 2016 to watch Garrix premiere the song, as millions streamed the performance live. "In the Name of Love" has since charted in over 30 countries.

James' premiered his second single, "In My Head" in July 2016, on Martin Garrix's 1st episode of STMPD Radio with Zane Lowe. Throughout the rest of 2016, James supported Garrix, Matoma, and Vanic on their worldwide tours.  James has since been seen working in the studio with Martin Garrix, Oliver Heldens, Morgan Page, Matthew Koma, and Lights, among others.

Discography

Singles

Songwriting and production

Remixes

References

External links 
 Website

1998 births
Living people
American DJs
Record producers from Pennsylvania
Electronic dance music DJs